Teluk Pulai is a modern residential and township located within the Klang town center in the state of Selangor, Malaysia. Teluk Pulai falls under the jurisdiction of the Klang Municipal Council (MPK) and divided by two DUN state assembly jurisdiction which is Bandar Baru Klang and Selat Klang.

Connectivity
Teluk Pulai is well connected to the Federal Highway through Jalan Raya Barat and the North Klang Straits Bypass as well North Klang Valley Expressway through Klang Third Bridge. Station KTM Teluk Pulai Komuter station is the rail public transportation serving the areas going directly to KL Sentral/Tanjong Malim or Port Klang.

Nearby residentials
 Taman Melawis
 Taman Teluk Pulai Indah
 Taman Teluk Pulai
 Taman Kota Jaya
 Taman Wangi
 Taman Aneka
 Kampung Sungai Udang
 Apartment Amaizing Height
 Pangsapuri Anggerik
 Pangsapuri Saujana Damai

Nearby landmarks and attractions
  Kota Raja Mahadi
Situated just next to Klang City Council MPK building, erected as a memorial of Klang War between Raja Abdullah and Raja Mahadi overlooking the Klang River.
Pengkalan Batu Park
Use to be trading port for antique Klang, Pengkalan Batu now a public park to enjoy the scenery of Klang river it can be easily accessed by LRT  Klang by 2023.
 Hong Shan Si Temple (凤山寺) 
A Taoism temple worshiping Nine Emperor Gods (九皇爷). Situated opposite commuter station. The Nine Emperor Gods Festival will be held from 1 to 9 September every year according to Lunar calendar. It is very crowded with worshipers.
 Teluk Pulai Local Night Market (Pasar Malam) 
It operates every Friday and Sunday night.
 Famous Bak Kut Teh Restaurants
Well-known Bak Kut Teh restaurants such as Teluk Pulai Bak Kut Teh and Klang Lek Bak Kut Teh are just five minutes' walking distance from Teluk Pulai commuter station.
 Tian Hock Kung Temple (天福宫)
Situated at Jalan Tepi Sungai. Famous for its snake theme temple architecture. Also known as Klang Snake Temple.
 Raja Muda Nala Bridge (Jambatan Raja Muda Nala)
Also known as Klang Third Bridge, connecting the northern and southern parts of Klang.

Facilities

Shopping
Econmart Jalan Sungai Bertik
Pasaraya Matahari Jalan Teluk Pulai
EcoShop Teluk Pulai
Pasaraya MU
Pasaraya MM
Convenient store such as 99 Speedmart, 7-Eleven, KK Mart and Familymart.

Education
Primary schools

Sekolah Jenis Kebangsaan (Cina) Chuen Min 循民华小
Sekolah Kebangsaan Teluk Pulai
Sekolah Kebangsaan Taman Gembira 
Sekolah Kebangsaan (Lelaki) Methodist ACS
Sekolah Rendah Agama Jalan Hassan
Sekolah Kebangsaan Telok Gadong
Sekolah Kebangsaan Sungai Udang

Secondary schools

Sekolah Menengah Kebangsaan Telok Gadong 
Sekolah Menengah Kebangsaan Methodist ACS 
Sekolah Menengah Kebangsaan Perempuan Methodist 
Sekolah Agama Menengah Sultan Hisamuddin

Government Department
 The Klang Municipal Council (MPK) building
 Civil Defense Department (JPA), Klang district office
 Department of Civil Works (JKR), Klang district office
 Sungai Bertik Health Clinic (Klinik Kesihatan)

References

External links
 Klang Municipal Council (MPK)
 Profile of Bandar Baru Klang
 Klang Community eSpace and Forums

Klang District
Townships in Selangor